Asil Kaan Güler (born 24 March 1994) is a Turkish professional footballer who plays as a goalkeeper for Kızılcabölükspor.

External links
Asil Kaan Güler at tff.org

1994 births
Living people
People from Turgutlu
Turkish footballers
Denizlispor footballers
Vanspor footballers
TFF First League players
TFF Second League players
Association football goalkeepers